Osseo is a city located in Trempealeau County, Wisconsin, at the confluence of the North and South Forks of the Buffalo River. The population was 1,701 at the 2010 census.

Geography
Osseo is located at 44°34'42" North, 91°13'6" West (44.578306, -91.218273).

The city lies on US Highway 10 (which serves as the main east–west thoroughfare through town), US Highway 53, and Interstate 94.

Demographics

2010 census
As of the census of 2010, there were 1,701 people, 737 households, and 444 families living in the city. The racial makeup of the city was 97.6% White, 0.1% African American, 0.9% Native American, 0.1% Asian, 0.6% from other races, and 0.6% from two or more races. Hispanic or Latino of any race were 1.6% of the population.

There were 737 households, of which 32.4% had children under the age of 18 living with them, 44.6% were married couples living together, 11.3% had a female householder with no husband present, 4.3% had a male householder with no wife present, and 39.8% were non-families. 33.6% of all households were made up of individuals, and 17.3% had someone living alone who was 65 years of age or older. The average household size was 2.31 and the average family size was 2.96.

The median age in the city was 38.5 years. 26% of residents were under the age of 18; 7.4% were between the ages of 18 and 24; 25.6% were from 25 to 44; 23.5% were from 45 to 64; and 17.5% were 65 years of age or older. The gender makeup of the city was 47.5% male and 52.5% female.

2000 census
As of the census of 2000, there were 1,669 people, 721 households, and 451 families living in the city. The population density was 809.5 people per square mile (312.8/km2). There were 761 housing units at an average density of 369.1 per square mile (142.6/km2). The racial makeup of the city was 99.28% White, 0.06% African American, 0.36% Native American, 0.06% Asian, 0.00% Pacific Islander, 0.00% from other races, and 0.24% from two or more races. 0.36% of the population were Hispanic or Latino of any race.

There were 721 households, out of which 28.7% had children under the age of 18 living with them, 49.7% were married couples living together, 9.4% had a female householder with no husband present, and 37.4% were non-families. 32.6% of all households were made up of individuals, and 19.0% had someone living alone who was 65 years of age or older. The average household size was 2.25 and the average family size was 2.84.

In the city, the population was spread out, with 23.9% under the age of 18, 7.8% from 18 to 24, 26.5% from 25 to 44, 18.7% from 45 to 64, and 23.1% who were 65 years of age or older. The median age was 39 years. For every 100 females, there were 87.3 males. For every 100 females age 18 and over, there were 82.2 males.

The median income for a household in the city was $34,493, and the median income for a family was $40,819. Males had a median income of $28,934 versus $21,838 for females. The per capita income for the city was $18,512. 5.7% of the population and 2.9% of families were below the poverty line. 6.3% of those under the age of 18 and 7.7% of those 65 and older were living below the poverty line.

Notable people
Steve Gunderson, former Republican congressman.
Chauncey E. Heath, Wisconsin State Representative
James L. Linderman, Wisconsin State Representative
Tom Lomsdahl, Wisconsin State Representative

References

External links
 Osseo, Wisconsin

Cities in Wisconsin
Cities in Trempealeau County, Wisconsin